Cristopher Moisés Rolin (born 3 September 1993), commonly known as Crístofer, is a Spanish-born Equatorial Guinean footballer who plays for Icelandic club Ægir as a striker. He was a member of the Equatorial Guinea national team.

Club career
Born in Alcalá de Henares, Madrid to Equatorial Guinean parents, Crístofer was an EMF Águilas de Moratalaz's graduate, after representing a host of teams as a youth, notably RSD Alcalá in 2011. He made his debuts as a senior in the 2012–13 campaign, appearing sparingly in the lower leagues.

In 2013 Crístofer moved to fellow Regional Preferente team EF Periso, In late August 2015, he joined CDC Moscardó in Tercera División, but was initially assigned for the B-side.

International career
Crístofer's mother was the daughter of a Santomean couple. As a result, he was eligible for Spain, Equatorial Guinea and São Tomé and Príncipe national teams.

In June 2015, Crístofer was called up for Equatorial Guinea national team. He made his full international debut on 6 June 2015, coming on as a second-half substitute in a 1–0 friendly win against Andorra.

Career statistics

International

Personal life
Crístofer is of Bubi descent through his father.

References

External links

1993 births
Living people
Footballers from the Community of Madrid
People from Alcalá de Henares
Spanish sportspeople of Equatoguinean descent
Spanish people of Bubi descent
Spanish people of São Tomé and Príncipe descent
People of Bubi descent
Equatoguinean people of São Tomé and Príncipe descent
Citizens of Equatorial Guinea through descent
Association football forwards
Spanish footballers
Equatoguinean footballers
Equatorial Guinea international footballers
RSD Alcalá players
Skallagrímur men's football players
Ungmennafélagið Sindri players
Knattspyrnufélagið Ægir players
Tercera División players
Divisiones Regionales de Fútbol players
Equatoguinean expatriate footballers
Equatoguinean expatriate sportspeople in Iceland
Expatriate footballers in Iceland
Spanish expatriate footballers
Spanish expatriate sportspeople in Iceland